Bullet Tree Falls is a village located along the Mopan River in Cayo District, Belize. It lies approximately five kilometers (three miles) northwest of San Ignacio. According to the 2010 census, Bullet Tree Falls has a population of 2,124 people in 426 households. The population consists mainly of Spanish-speaking mestizos, along with a smaller number of Yucatec Maya and Creoles.

Government
Bullet Tree Falls is governed by a seven-person village council. As of 2019, the chairperson of the council is Sabino Pinelo.

History
Bullet Tree Falls was originally settled by loggers, and by the late 1800s had attracted a small number of Maya families. After the Caste War of Yucatán numerous Maya refugees from the north settled in the area. During the early 20th century, an influx of mestizos migrated to the village from Guatemala and Mexico. The first Creoles settled in Bullet Tree Falls in the 1950s, arriving from San Ignacio.

During the early days of the chicle and timber industries in Belize, the village was an important trading post. In 1961, Hurricane Hattie caused significant damage to the village, destroying a school building and church. In 1988, the Salvador Fernandez Bridge was completed, replacing an older wooden bridge.

Attractions

Bullet Tree Falls has developed a small tourist economy facilitated by its location between San Ignacio and the El Pilar Maya archeological site. The village hosts several lodges and a small botanical garden. Buses between Bullet Tree Falls and San Ignacio run several times a day and taxi service is available to San Ignacio and El Pilar.

Gallery

References

External links 

 Bullet Tree Falls at Belize LocalWiki
 Map of Bullet Tree Falls at OpenStreetMap

Populated places in Cayo District
Cayo North